Saleh Mohammad Saleh (born 24 February 1973) is a former professional snooker player from Afghanistan. He represented Pakistan between 1988 and 2006. He reached the final of the IBSF World Snooker Championship in 2003 and won two medals at 2002 Asian Games.

Life and career
He was born in Afghanistan and lived as a refugee among the Afghans in Pakistan. He began representing Pakistan in 1988 as an international snooker player. Saleh turned pro in 1995, but lost his place after just one season. In 2003 he reached the final of the IBSF World Snooker Championship, by winning 14 consecutive matches, but lost 5–11 against Pankaj Advani. At the cue sports competitions of the 2002 Asian Games he won two bronze medals in doubles and team category. At the 2008 ACBS Asian Snooker Championship Mohammad compiled a maximum break against Nguyen Nhat Thanh. At the end of the same year he decided to retire in protest, because he "couldn't bear such injustice where cricketers were showered with cash awards on normal victories" and he "wasn't given anything."

In November 2010, after moving back to Afghanistan, Saleh told the Gulf News, "I want to give back something to my country and the only way I can do this is to assist Afghanistan's development in sports, particularly in snooker as that is what I am good at." He represented Afghanistan at the 2012 ACBS Asian Snooker Championship, reaching the quarter-finals, and the 2012 Six-red World Championship, reaching the last 32. In the Jubilee Insurance 29th Asian Snooker Championship, played Karachi, Pakistan, he decisively beat his Pakistani, Mongolian and Iranian rivals. On 19 June 2013 World Snooker announced, that Mohammad didn't confirm his intention to compete on the Main Tour, and was replaced by Ratchayothin Yotharuck.

Performance and rankings timeline

Amateur finals: 8 (4 titles)

References 

1973 births
Living people
Afghan snooker players
Pakistani snooker players
Asian Games medalists in cue sports
Asian Games bronze medalists for Pakistan
Cue sports players at the 2010 Asian Games
Cue sports players at the 2006 Asian Games
Cue sports players at the 2002 Asian Games
Afghan emigrants to Pakistan
Cue sports players at the 1998 Asian Games
Medalists at the 1998 Asian Games
Medalists at the 2002 Asian Games